Riccardia elegans is a species of plants in the liverwort family Aneuraceae.

References 

Metzgeriales